The Midland Railway (MR) operated ships from Heysham to Douglas and Belfast.

The MR operated vessels for port maintenance 

The MR owned several small passenger ferries formerly owned by the London, Tilbury and Southend Railway, with which it amalgamated in 1912, on the Gravesend–Tilbury Ferry.
Vessels acquired were: Carlotta, Catherine (blt 1903), Edith (1911), Gertrude, Rose (1901) and Tilbury (1883).

References

Midland Railway